103rd Ohio Volunteer Infantry Association Barracks is a registered historic building in Sheffield Lake, Ohio. It was listed in the National Register on July 14, 1978.

The 103rd Ohio Infantry served during the American Civil War. Members of the 103rd Ohio Infantry built and used the barracks to hold reunions after the war.

103rd Ohio Volunteer Infantry Museum 
The 103rd O.V.I. Memorial Foundation, composed of descendants of the 103rd Ohio Infantry, owns the building and operates the 103rd Ohio Volunteer Infantry Museum in the building. Displays include Civil War relics and artifacts including diaries and letters. The museum is open by appointment.

References 

Military facilities on the National Register of Historic Places in Ohio
Buildings and structures in Lorain County, Ohio
National Register of Historic Places in Lorain County, Ohio